Div Saffan may refer to:

Div Saffan-e Olya
Div Saffan-e Sofla